Richard Avery Humphrey (born January 8, 1986), better known by his stage name Preme (formerly P Reign), is a Canadian rapper, singer, songwriter, and record producer. He was formerly signed to The Blueprint Group (BPG) and RCA Records. He is currently signed to Empire Distribution, in conjunction with his own record label Reps Ups Entertainment, which is also in a joint-venture record deal with Columbia Records and a joint-venture publishing deal with Sony/ATV Music Publishing.

Career
Preme, also known as The King, the King of Da North, released his debut solo single in 2008 entitled "You Know I'm Fly", which topped the PunchMuch Canadian interactive music channel. His follow-up singles are "Money in My Pocket" (2009) and "In My Hood" (2010), produced by T-Minus. He is known as Preme because of his preterm birth, Preme being a changed spelling of "preemie", which is slang for premature.

Francis and the Lights, k-os, and Reign all toured with Drake on his Away from Home Tour across North America. Reign performed as an opening act. Due to legal troubles at the time, Reign was not able to cross into the United States and thus toured only in Canadian cities.

Alyssa Reid's big international hit "Alone Again" features P Reign. The single was a hit in Canada and many European charts and reached number 2 on UK Singles Chart. Canadian band Hedley's hit "Invincible" taken from their album Storms features P Reign. The single released August 23, 2011 reached number 9 on Canadian Hot 100 and was certified double platinum.

The Canadian Dream is his debut mixtape and was released in early 2008. His sophomore mixtape is called When It Reigns It Pours and was released on November 1, 2010. His third mixtape was to be called True Kings Don't Die but was changed to Dear America and its release date was scheduled for July 4, 2013 but was postponed and released under Sony/RCA as an EP. He also still release a mixtape a week later with additional songs also called Dear America. Billboard magazine reported in March 2013 that P Reign is collaborating with rapper A$AP Rocky for the next release "We Them Niggas" that was a part of P Reign's Dear America EP. P Reign is also collaborating with artists such as French Montana, Waka Flocka Flame and Drake. The EP was finally released on September 9, 2014. His song "Realest in the City" featuring Meek Mill and PartyNextDoor reached #1 on Billboards "Emerging Artists" chart.

Personal life
Preme has a son who was born in 2006.

In 2008, Reign was charged with nine counts of weapons possession charges after Toronto Police found three loaded handguns in the backseat of his leased Cadillac. He was acquitted of all charges on May 30, 2011. Preme referenced this on the unofficial remix to the song "Us" by Lil Reese rapping, "Drizzy dropped a hundred on my lawyer and I beat the case!"

Preme is close friends with fellow Torontonian rapper Drake and both have alluded to this on respective tracks. In the song "Intro" of his second mixtape, Reign raps "Shout out to Drizzy Drake, yeah that's my lil' bro / before the deal, we gettin' change like the corner store." Drake raps in the remake to Big Page's single "I'm Still Fly", "My brother P Reign knows we fuck with the same hoes / Plus he taught me how to spot an officer in plain clothes." Most recently, the two would collaborate (along with Southern rapper Future) on the single "DnF" from Reign's Dear America EP.

Discography: Preme

Studio albums

Extended plays

Singles
As featured artist

Discography: P. Reign

Extended plays
2014: Dear America EP

Mixtapes
2008: The Canadian Dream 
2010: When It Reigns It Pours
2014: Dear America
2015: Off the Books

Singles

As lead artist

As featured artist

Guest appearances

Awards and nominations

References

External links
Preme Twitter

1986 births
Living people
21st-century Canadian male musicians
21st-century Canadian rappers
Black Canadian musicians
Canadian male rappers
Canadian people of Guyanese descent
Canadian songwriters
Midwest hip hop musicians
Musicians from Montreal
Rappers from Toronto
RCA Records artists
Canadian record producers
Canadian hip hop singers
Canadian hip hop record producers